Trimberg is a town in the Elfershausen municipality in Bavaria, Germany.

The surname von Trimberg is that of the medieval noble family of the eponymous castle Trimburg.
 Hugo von Trimberg
 Süßkind von Trimberg is a medieval poet of uncertain historicity
 2990 Trimberger  is an asteroid